Madonna and Child with St Anthony of Padua and St Roch is a c.1511 oil on canvas painting by Titian, originally given to Philip IV of Spain by his viceroy of Naples Ramiro Núñez de Guzmán and now in the Prado Museum in Madrid.

In 1657 it was recorded in the sacristy of the Escorial Monastery, where it was misattributed to "Bordonon", perhaps a misspelling of Paris Bordone. Later reattributed to Giorgione, Pordenone and then Francesco Vecellio, it was finally returned to its correct attribution by most critics due to its composition and symmetry.

References

Paintings of the Madonna and Child by Titian
Paintings of Saint Roch
Paintings of Anthony of Padua
Paintings by Titian in the Museo del Prado
1511 paintings